Ixodes scapularis is commonly known as the deer tick or black-legged tick (although some people reserve the latter term for Ixodes pacificus, which is found on the west coast of the US), and in some parts of the US as the bear tick. It was also named Ixodes dammini until it was shown to be the same species in 1993. It is a hard-bodied tick found in the eastern and northern Midwest of the United States as well as in southeastern Canada. It is a vector for several diseases of animals, including humans (Lyme disease, babesiosis, anaplasmosis, Powassan virus disease, etc.) and is known as the deer tick owing to its habit of parasitizing the white-tailed deer. It is also known to parasitize mice, lizards, migratory birds, etc. especially while the tick is in the larval or nymphal stage.

Description
The image shown here—and in fact, most images of Ixodes scapularis that are commonly available—show an adult female that is unengorged, that is, an adult female that has not had a blood meal. This is natural, since ticks are generally removed immediately upon discovery to minimize the chance of disease. However, the abdomen that holds blood is much larger when engorged; therefore, an engorged specimen of I. scapularis (see photo below) could easily be mistaken for an entirely different tick.

When the deer tick has consumed a blood meal, its abdomen is a light grayish-blue color. The tick itself is naturally black when unfed. In identifying an engorged tick, concentrating on the legs and upper part of the body is helpful.

Behavior
Ixodes scapularis has a 2-year lifecycle, during which time it passes through three stages: larva, nymph, and adult. The tick must take a blood meal at each stage before maturing to the next. Deer tick females latch onto a host and drink its blood for 4–5 days. Deer are the preferred host of the adult deer tick, but it is also known to feed on small rodents. After she is engorged, the tick drops off and overwinters in the leaf litter of the forest floor. The following spring, the female lays several hundred to a few thousand eggs in clusters. Transtadial (between tick stages) passage of Borrelia burgdorferi is common. Vertical passage (from mother to egg) of Borrelia is uncommon.

Like other ticks, I. scapularis is hardy. It can be active after a hard frost, as daytime temperatures can warm it enough to keep it actively searching for a host. In the spring, it can be one of the first invertebrates to become active. Deer ticks can be quite numerous and seemingly gregarious.

As disease vector

Ixodes scapularis is the main vector of Lyme disease in North America. The CDC reported over 30,000 new cases of the disease in 2016 alone, the majority of which were contracted in the summer months, which is when ticks are most likely to bite humans. While adult deer ticks are more likely to carry and transmit Borrelia burgdorferi, it is more common for the hard-to-spot nymphal stage to infect humans.

It can also transmit other Borrelia species, including Borrelia miyamotoi. Ticks that transmit B. burgdorferi to humans can also carry and transmit several other parasites, such as Babesia microti and Anaplasma phagocytophilum, which cause the diseases babesiosis and human granulocytic anaplasmosis (HGA), respectively. Among early Lyme disease patients, depending on their location, 2%–12% will also have HGA and 2%–40% will have babesiosis.

Co-infections complicate Lyme symptoms, especially diagnosis and treatment. It is possible for a tick to carry and transmit one of the co-infections and not Borrelia, making diagnosis difficult and often elusive. The Centers for Disease Control's emerging infectious diseases department did a study in rural New Jersey of 100 ticks, and found 55% of the ticks were infected with at least one of the pathogens.

Deer, the preferred mammalian hosts of adult I. scapularis, cannot transmit Borrelia spirochaetes to ticks. Ticks acquire Lyme disease microbes by feeding on infected mice and other small rodents as nymphs or larvae.

One of the keys of the success of I. scapularis as a Borrelia vector relies on its ability to limit the proliferation of the spirochaete. This is due to the activity of domesticated amidase effector (dae) genes. Dae genes are a family of horizontally acquired genes related to type VI secretion amidase effector (tae) genes in certain bacteria which encode toxins honed to mediate interbacterial antagonism. Once transferred to eukaryotes tae genes confer novel antibacterial capabilities; this provides a selective advantage to the tick and to other eukaryotes also: tae genes have been transferred from bacteria to eukaryotes at least in six independent events. In particular, I. scapularis have inherited the dae 2 family from a common ancestor between ticks and mites. The product of dae2 expression has been shown to degrade bacterial peptidoglycan of different species and particularly from B. burgdorferi, but does not limit initial acquisition of the bacterium by the tick. Dae2 contributes to the innate ability of I. scapularis to control B. burgdorferi levels after its acquisition. This has potential ramifications for Lyme disease transmission, as spirochaete load in the tick can influence transmission efficiency.

A recent study has identified the alpha-gal sugar in the tick, and they have suggested that it may also be involved in the onset of red meat allergy (Alpha-Gal Syndrome or Mammalian Meat Allergy, MMA).

Genome sequencing

The genome of I. scapularis has been sequenced.

See also
 Ticks of domestic animals
 Andrew Spielman

References

External links

 Information on Tick-Related Health Threats and Deer Tick Fact Sheet from the National Pest Management Association
 black-legged tick, Ixodes scapularis on the UF / IFAS Featured Creatures Web site
 Ixodes scapularis, black-legged tick, deer tick overview as a vector for Lyme disease, developmental stages at MetaPathogen
 Ixodes scapularis genome sequence at VectorBase
 Powassan Virus: Transmission on the Centers for Disease Control and Prevention website.

scapularis
Arachnids of North America
Parasitic acari
Animals described in 1821
Taxa named by Thomas Say